The 2018 Kentucky House of Representatives elections were held on November 6, 2018, as part of the biennial United States elections. All 100 of Kentucky's state representatives were up for reelection. In Kentucky, members of the House of Representatives serve two-year terms. Accordingly, they are up for reelection in both presidential and midterm election years.

Democrats, who had long been the dominant party at the state level in Kentucky, held a majority in the State House from 1922 to 2017. In 2016, Republicans made large gains in the chamber, winning a majority of 64 seats. Both parties flipped several seats in 2018, with Republicans grabbing six seats from the Democrats and Democrats taking eight from the Republicans, for a net gain of two Democratic seats. Many of the Democratic gains were in suburban areas, including around Louisville, Lexington, and Owensboro. Republicans made gains in some of Democrats' remaining rural districts, though they significantly underperformed in Appalachian Eastern Kentucky, where Democrats picked up multiple seats.

Several races were decided by extremely narrow margins. Four seats—Districts 13, 27, 91, and 96—were all decided by seven votes or fewer. Republicans ultimately maintained their majority in the chamber, winning 61 seats to the Democrats' 39.

Closest races 
Seats where the margin of victory was under 10%:
  gain
  gain
  gain
 
  gain
  gain
  gain
 
 
 
 
  gain
 
 
  gain
  
  
 
  gain
  gain

Election results

All results are official and certified by the Kentucky State Board of Elections.

District 1

District 2

District 3

District 4

District 5

District 6

District 7

District 8

District 9

District 10

District 11

District 12

District 13

District 14

District 15

District 16

District 17

District 18

District 19

District 20

District 21

District 22

District 23

District 24

District 25

District 26

District 27

District 28

District 29

District 30

District 31

District 32

District 33

District 34

District 35

District 36

District 37

District 38

District 39

District 40

District 41

District 42

District 43

District 44

District 45

District 46

District 47

District 48

District 49

District 50

District 51

District 52

District 53

District 54

District 55

District 56

District 57

District 58

District 59

District 60

District 61

District 62

District 63

District 64

District 65

District 66

District 67

District 68

District 69

District 70

District 71

District 72

District 73

District 74

District 75

District 76

District 77

District 78

District 79

District 80

District 81

District 82

District 83

District 84

District 85

District 86

District 87

District 88

District 89

District 90

District 91

District 92

District 93

District 94

District 95

District 96

District 97

District 98

District 99

District 100

References

House
Kentucky House of Representatives elections